Dia de les Illes Balears (English: Day of the Balearic Islands) is a celebration and public holiday in the Balearic Islands.

It's celebrated every year on 1 March and it commemorates the creation of the Balearic Statute of Autonomy within the Spanish Constitution that became effective on 1 March 1983.

References 

Balearic culture
National days
Public holidays in Spain
March observances